In geometry, a 6-demicube or demihexteract is a uniform 6-polytope, constructed from a 6-cube (hexeract) with alternated vertices removed. It is part of a dimensionally infinite family of uniform polytopes called demihypercubes.

E. L. Elte identified it in 1912 as a semiregular polytope, labeling it as HM6 for a 6-dimensional half measure polytope.

Coxeter named this polytope as 131 from its Coxeter diagram, with a ring on one of the 1-length branches, . It can named similarly by a 3-dimensional exponential Schläfli symbol  or {3,33,1}.

Cartesian coordinates 
Cartesian coordinates for the vertices of a demihexeract centered at the origin are alternate halves of the hexeract:
 (±1,±1,±1,±1,±1,±1)
with an odd number of plus signs.

As a configuration
This configuration matrix represents the 6-demicube. The rows and columns correspond to vertices, edges, faces, cells, 4-faces and 5-faces. The diagonal numbers say how many of each element occur in the whole 6-demicube. The nondiagonal numbers say how many of the column's element occur in or at the row's element.

The diagonal f-vector numbers are derived through the Wythoff construction, dividing the full group order of a subgroup order by removing one mirror at a time.

Images

Related polytopes 
There are 47 uniform polytopes with D6 symmetry, 31 are shared by the B6 symmetry, and 16 are unique:

The 6-demicube, 131 is third in a dimensional series of uniform polytopes, expressed by Coxeter as k31 series. The fifth figure is a Euclidean honeycomb, 331, and the final is a noncompact hyperbolic honeycomb, 431. Each progressive uniform polytope is constructed from the previous as its vertex figure.

It is also the second in a dimensional series of uniform polytopes and honeycombs, expressed by Coxeter as 13k series. The fourth figure is the Euclidean honeycomb 133 and the final is a noncompact hyperbolic honeycomb, 134.

Skew icosahedron
Coxeter identified a subset of 12 vertices that form a regular skew icosahedron {3, 5} with the same symmetries as the icosahedron itself, but at different angles. He dubbed this the regular skew icosahedron.

References 

 H.S.M. Coxeter: 
 Coxeter, Regular Polytopes, (3rd edition, 1973), Dover edition, p.296, Table I (iii): Regular Polytopes, three regular polytopes in n-dimensions (n≥5)
 H.S.M. Coxeter, Regular Polytopes, 3rd Edition, Dover New York, 1973, p.296, Table I (iii): Regular Polytopes, three regular polytopes in n-dimensions (n≥5)
 Kaleidoscopes: Selected Writings of H.S.M. Coxeter, edited by F. Arthur Sherk, Peter McMullen, Anthony C. Thompson, Asia Ivic Weiss, Wiley-Interscience Publication, 1995,  
 (Paper 22) H.S.M. Coxeter, Regular and Semi Regular Polytopes I, [Math. Zeit. 46 (1940) 380-407, MR 2,10]
 (Paper 23) H.S.M. Coxeter, Regular and Semi-Regular Polytopes II, [Math. Zeit. 188 (1985) 559-591]
 (Paper 24) H.S.M. Coxeter, Regular and Semi-Regular Polytopes III, [Math. Zeit. 200 (1988) 3-45]
 John H. Conway, Heidi Burgiel, Chaim Goodman-Strass, The Symmetries of Things 2008,  (Chapter 26. pp. 409: Hemicubes: 1n1)

External links 

 Multi-dimensional Glossary

6-polytopes